Beauséjour is a former commune and was a village in France that was largely destroyed in World War I. Now it was part of the commune of Minaucourt-le-Mesnil-lès-Hurlus (Marne).

Founded in 1820, it was the scene of historic fighting between the Germans, French, and English in 1914 and 1915.  It was not rebuilt after the war. Today it is the site of historic markers. The village received coverage in news articles years later, as France's oldest recorded man, Maurice Floquet, fought at the battle as a soldier and survived.

References
 http://www.lib.byu.edu/~rdh/wwi/1915/neuvecha.html
 https://web.archive.org/web/20060320155810/http://crdp.ac-reims.fr/memoire/lieux/1GM_CA/villages_detruits/beausejour.htm

External links
 La Fermede Beauséjour—Article in French
 En Champagne 1915—An account of the fighting in the area 

Former populated places in France
France in World War I
Geography of Marne (department)
Ghost towns in France
History of Marne (department)
Aftermath of World War I in France